The Bandy World Championship 2009 was held between 18 and 25 January in Västerås, Sweden. Men's teams from 13 countries participated in the 2009 competition: Belarus, Finland, Kazakhstan, Norway, Russia, Sweden (group A) and Canada, Estonia, Hungary, Latvia, Mongolia, the Netherlands and the United States (group B). Belarus retained their place in group A by beating the United States in a play off in the previous tournament held in 2008. 44 games were played. 4 out of these were played on other sites than Västerås. Games were played in Solna, Stockholm, Eskilstuna and Uppsala. The main venues were ABB Arena Syd in Västerås, Sweden's largest indoor arena for bandy, and Hakonplan, an outdoor stadium. These two arenas are placed on the same recreation area in Västerås, Rocklunda sports park. The time in Västerås is UTC+1.

The six teams of Group A competed for the championship, while the seven teams in Group B competed for a chance to play in Group A in 2010. Sweden defeated Russia in the final, 6–1, to take the gold medal. Finland took the bronze, while Kazakhstan and Norway earned fourth and fifth places, respectively. Belarus, after finishing at the bottom of the Group A pool, had to face the winner of the Group B pool to retain its place in the championship group for the next year. For the fifth straight year, Belarus beat the United States in this match.

Venues

ABB Arena Syd and Hakonplan in Västerås staged 40 games. The other venues were:
Bergshamra IP, Solna
Eskilstuna Isstadion, Eskilstuna
Studenternas IP, Uppsala
Zinkensdamms IP, Stockholm

Rules
Team rosters are limited to 17 players in each game, with 11 playing and 6 reserves at a time. Game durations are 90 minutes for Group A matches and 60 minutes for Group B matches, in each case divided into equal halves.

 Group A, the World Cup Championship, starts as a single-match round robin league. The top four teams advance to the semifinals, where the team placed as number 1 meets number 4, and number 2 meets number 3. The two winners advance to the final, while the losers play a bronze match.
 Group B also begins with a round robin. The winner of the preliminary round plays against the last-place team from Group A for the right to play in Group A in 2010. The remaining teams are paired off for placement matches.
 No game can end with a draw—if a preliminary round match is tied after regulation, or a playoff match is tied after extra time, a penalty stroke competition is arranged. Each team takes five penalty shots, with different strikers. If it is still a draw, the penalty shots will continue one by one until a decisive result has been attained. Regardless of the result of the penalty strokes, the game is counted as a draw in the table for preliminary pool matches.
 The number of points is decisive for placing in the preliminary round. Two points are scored for a win, one for a draw, and none for a loss.
 Should the number of points be equal for two teams, the result between those two teams (including penalty strokes, if necessary) in the preliminary round is decisive.
 Should the number of points be equal for three or four teams, the score difference among tied teams is the first tie-breaker followed by goals scored. Only regulation time goals are counted, not penalty strokes. If this leaves two teams still tied, the tie between the two remaining teams is broken by head-to-head result.
 If separation still is not possible, the score difference from all matches in the preliminary round is used.
 If teams still can't be separated, placing is done by drawing of lots.
 All matches following the preliminary round are to be played until the winner is decided. If it is a draw after 90 or 60 minutes the match shall be extended with sudden death overtime, with two halves of 15 minutes. If it is still a draw, penalty strokes will be used.

Participating teams

Division A

Division B

Squads

Division A

Preliminary round

Semifinals

Match for 3rd place

Final

Statistics
Statistics for goalscorers during Bandy World Championships 2009.

Goalscorers
14 goals

  Joakim Hedqvist
  Yevgeny Ivanushkin

13 goals

  Sami Laakkonen
  Patrik Nilsson
  Pavel Ryazantsev

12 goals

  Sergey Obukhov

9 goals

  Vyacheslav Bronnikov
  Sergey Lomanov, Jr.

7 goals

  Rasmus Lindqvist
  Ivan Maksimov
  Mikhail Sveshnikov

6 goals

  Sergey Cherneckiy
  Markus Kumpuoja
  Anders Östling

5 goals

  Evgeni Chvalko
  Christoffer Edlund
  Rauan Issaliyev

4 goals

  Per Hellmyrs
  Yuriy Loginov
  Alexander Tukavin
  Alexey Zagarskiy

3 goals

  Ville Aaltonen
  Marcus Bergwall
  Pål Hanssen
  Andrey Kovalyov
  Jan Fredrik Løland
  Mikko Lukkarila
  Andreas Westh

2 goals

  Leonid Bedarev
  Daniel Berlin
  Antti Ekman
  Kimmo Huotelin
  Kjetil Johansen
  Denis Kriushenkov
  Christer Lystad
  Sergey Shaburov
  Artiom Zibarev

1 goals

  Mikko Aarni
  Johan Andersson
  Artem Botvenkov
  Dmitriy Duben
  Jonas Edling
  Stefan Erixon
  Daniel Jonsson
  Aleksander Kim
  Alexey Kurochkin
  Petteri Lampinen
  Juho Liukkonen
  Daniel Mossberg
  Samuli Niskanen
  Yury Pogrebnoy
  Dmitri Starikov
  Daniel Välitalo
  Yury Vikulin
  Christian Waaler
  Yuriy Zenkov

Division B

Preliminary round

Final Tour

Match 2nd place Group B

Match 6th place Group B

Match 4th place Group B

Qualification for Group A

Ranking

Group B included

FIB Broadcasting rights
TF1 Group; Eurosport 2, Eurosport Asia
Sweden; SVT
Finland; YLE FST
Eurosport 2 is broadcast in 46 countries with 11 of them in origin language
Eurosport Asia Pacific is broadcast in 10 Asian countries; Japan, Malaysia, China, Hong Kong, Philippines, Australia, New Zealand, Thailand, Singapore, Indonesia.

See also
 Bandy World Championship

References

External links
 Official website
 Bandy VM final 2009, pictures from a Swedish photographer

2009 in bandy
2009 in Swedish sport
2009
International bandy competitions hosted by Sweden
Sports competitions in Västerås
January 2009 sports events in Europe
Sports competitions in Uppsala
Sports competitions in Eskilstuna
Sports competitions in Solna